Euglandina pilsbryi is a species of predatory air-breathing land snail, a terrestrial pulmonate gastropod mollusk in the family Spiraxidae.

The specific name pilsbryi is in honor of American malacologist Henry Augustus Pilsbry.

References

Spiraxidae
Gastropods described in 1909